Franz Freiherr von Werneck (13 October 1748 – 17 January 1806), enlisted in the army of Habsburg Austria and fought in the Austro-Turkish War, the French Revolutionary Wars, and the Napoleonic Wars. He enjoyed a distinguished career until 1797, when he lost a battle and was dismissed as punishment. He was only reinstated in 1805. In that year he surrendered his command and was later brought up on charges. He died while awaiting a court-martial.

Early career
Born in the Württemberg royal residence on 13 October 1748, Werneck entered the service of Habsburg Austria in 1764 as an Oberleutnant in the Weid-Runkel Infantry Regiment Nr. 28. Shortly afterward, he transferred to the Stain Infantry Regiment Nr. 50 as a Hauptmann (captain). After 20 years of service in the regiment he became its Oberst (colonel) in 1784. During the war with Ottoman Turkey, he led his troops in the first of several actions at Slatina-Timiş on 13 September 1788, where he captured a hill. The following year he fought at Mehadia. Werneck made his reputation on 30 September 1789 while leading the 1st Assault Column at the Siege of Belgrade. On this occasion his command included a battalion of the Stain Regiment, a battalion of grenadiers, and a company of volunteers. On 9 October after the siege was successfully concluded, Francis II, Holy Roman Emperor appointed him General-major. On 19 December 1790, he was decorated with the Knight's Cross of the Military Order of Maria Theresa.

French Revolutionary Wars
After the outbreak of the War of the First Coalition, Werneck led a contingent of grenadiers with distinction at the Battle of Jemappes on 6 November 1792. In December 1792, Pierre de Ruel, marquis de Beurnonville led 20,000 French troops to overrun the Electorate of Trier. He was opposed by a force commanded by Friedrich Wilhelm, Fürst zu Hohenlohe-Kirchberg. The defenders were surrounded by 4 December, but thereafter they repelled repeated French attacks. In this stage of the fighting, Werneck commanded the Reserve at Grevenmacher which included single battalions of the Matheson Infantry Regiment Nr. 42 and Murray Infantry Regiment Nr. 55, plus two squadrons of the Latour Chevau-léger Regiment Nr. 31. By 17 December, the French effort collapsed and Beurnonville's army melted away.

Werneck was present at Aldenhoven on 1 March 1793 where Henri Christian Michel de Stengel's column was defeated by two Austrian cavalry regiments. He fought in the Battle of Neerwinden on 18 March. He served at the successful Siege of Valenciennes from 25 May to 27 July and at the failed Siege of Dunkirk from 24 August to 8 September. He led a brigade in József Alvinczi's Reserve at the Battle of Le Cateau on 29 March 1794. Promoted to Feldmarschall-Leutnant on 28 May, he served in the army of William, Hereditary Prince of Orange. In 1795 he led troops in François Sébastien de Croix de Clerfayt's army on the middle Rhine. The actions included the Battle of Mainz on 29 October, where he led the Reserve, and the Battle of Pfeddersheim on 10 November.

Werneck served in Archduke Charles, Duke of Teschen's brilliant Rhine Campaign of 1796. At the Battle of Würzburg on 3 September, he led a division of 12 grenadier battalions in Wilhelm von Wartensleben's Reserve. His brigade commanders were Johann Kollowrat, Joseph von Schellenberg, and Ludwig von Vogelsang. On 18 September he was awarded the Commander's Cross of the Military Order of Maria Theresa. When Charles took troops to join Maximilian Anton Karl, Count Baillet de Latour, Werneck was left in command of the independent Army of the Lower Rhine beginning in September. His position remained unmolested by the French during the winter. On 18 April, Lazare Hoche and 38,000 French troops from the Army of Sambre-et-Meuse caught Werneck's 21,000 Austrians by surprise in the Battle of Neuwied. After heavy fighting, his soldiers were driven from the field with losses of 1,000 killed and wounded, plus 3,000 captured. In addition, 24 artillery pieces, 60 wagons, and five colors became trophies of the French. Total French losses were 2,000. On 17 April, when Jean Etienne Championnet's division threatened Werneck's right wing, the Austrian general weakened his left under Pál Kray in order to bolster his right. When the divisions of Paul Grenier and François Joseph Lefebvre began crossing the Rhine at 3:00 AM, Werneck hurriedly ordered Kray's troops back to defend his left. Lefebvre defeated the Austrian left flank, while Grenier broke through Kray's line of redoubts at Heddersdorf after repeated assaults. Hoche's offensive forced the Austrians into a deep withdrawal which ended only with news of the Treaty of Leoben. After the defeat, Werneck was placed in retirement on half-pay.

Napoleonic Wars

At the start of the War of the Third Coalition in 1805, Werneck was reactivated and appointed to the army in Germany. Despite some attempts at reform, the Austrian army remained wedded to 18th century concepts of warfare. The army's brigades and divisions were only semi-permanent units, and corps-sized formations were organized on an ad hoc basis. There were no corps and division staffs such as existed in the French army, which had permanent brigades, divisions, and corps. The French armies had won notable victories in 1800, but under Emperor Napoleon I of France they were even more powerful and effective in 1805. To Austria's greater disadvantage, the nominal army commander, Archduke Ferdinand Karl Joseph of Austria-Este was at odds with his deputy, Karl Mack von Lieberich. The archduke and Mack's chief of staff Anton Mayer von Heldensfeld wanted to halt at the Lech River as originally planned, while Mack desired to keep marching to the Iller River at Ulm. After Emperor Francis I of Austria upheld Mack and sacked Mayer, the Austrian army began concentrating on the Iller. The flanks were held by Franz Jellacic's 11,000 troops near Lake Constance and Michael von Kienmayer's 12,000 men at Ingolstadt on the Danube.

While Jean Lannes's V Corps and Joachim Murat's Cavalry Corps moved directly east on Ulm, the rest of Napoleon's  army swept past Ulm on the north bank of the Danube. Crossing the river to the east of the Austrians, the French I, II, III, IV, and VI Corps got between Ulm and Vienna. Austrian defeats at the battles of Wertingen and Günzburg followed on 8 and 9 October. A breakout attempt failed on 11 October at the Battle of Haslach-Jungingen. Finally, on 13 October, Mack ordered Werneck to march his corps northeast from Ulm in order to escape from the trap. His south flank was covered by Johann Sigismund Riesch's corps which held Elchingen. Archduke Ferdinand fled from Ulm with some cavalry.

Michel Ney's VI Corps smashed Riesch on 14 October in the Battle of Elchingen and forced the survivors to retreat to Ulm. Murat set out in pursuit of Werneck. On 16 October, there was a clash between Ney's cavalry and Prince Friedrich Franz Xaver of Hohenzollern-Hechingen's division at Langenau. Murat caught a 5,000-man brigade under Rudolf Sinzendorf at Herbrechtingen on 17 October and wiped out half of it. On the same day, Ferdinand's cavalry fought off the French cavalry at Nördlingen and there was another clash with Werneck's troops at Neresheim. Murat and Ney with 28,000 troops cornered their adversary at Treuchtlingen on 19 October. On that day Werneck capitulated with 15,000 troops, 28 guns, 12 colors, two standards, and four generals. Murat demanded that the terms include nearby Austrian units and Werneck accepted. Because of this the artillery reserve also surrendered. Hohenzollern refused to join in the capitulation and got away with 10 squadrons of cavalry. Ferdinand also managed to escape to Bohemia with Karl Philipp, Prince of Schwarzenberg and 12 squadrons of horsemen. On 20 October Mack surrendered at Ulm with 20,000 infantry, over 3,000 cavalry, and 59 guns.

For his surrender, charges were brought against Werneck. On 17 January 1806, he died of a stroke while awaiting court-martial at the fortress town of Hradec Králové (Königgrätz).

Family
Werneck's son Reinhard von Werneck briefly joined the Austrian military before transferring to the army of the Electorate of Bavaria. In between his military duties, he became noted as a gardener.

Notes
Footnotes

Citations

References

 Rickard, J. historyofwar.org Battle of Neuwied, 18 April 1797

 Smith, Digby, compiled by Leopold Kudrna napoleon-series.org Austrian Generals: 1792-1815 Franz Werneck

1748 births
1806 deaths
Military personnel from Stuttgart
People from the Duchy of Württemberg
Austrian generals
Barons of Austria
Military leaders of the French Revolutionary Wars
Austrian Empire military leaders of the French Revolutionary Wars
Austrian Empire commanders of the Napoleonic Wars
Commanders Cross of the Military Order of Maria Theresa